alpha-Endorphin (α-Endorphin) is an endogenous opioid peptide with a length of 16 amino acids, and the amino acid sequence: Tyr-Gly-Gly-Phe-Met-Thr-Ser-Glu-Lys-Ser-Gln-Thr-Pro-Leu-Val-Thr. With the use of mass spectrometry, Nicholas Ling was able to determine the primary sequence of a-endorphin.

Relation to beta- and gamma-endorphin 
Endorphins are generally known as neurotransmitters that are released when the body goes into pain. The three endorphins that play a role in this response are Alpha-endorphins, Beta-endorphins, and Gamma-endorphins which are all derived from the same polypeptide known as pro-opiomelanocortin. Although all play roles as neurotransmitters, the specific effects of all three differ. The most studied endorphin of the three is Beta-endorphin. Alpha-endorphins are known to contain one less amino acid than gamma endorphins, differing by a single leucine amino acid at the terminal end. Although this may seem minor, It allows them to have vastly different effects. Studies found that Gamma-endorphins and Alpha-endorphins have opposite effects which allow them to help maintain a level of homeostasis within the brain and behavior of animals. All of the specific effects on the body of Alpha endorphins are not yet fully studied nor fully understood by the science community. However, some studies suggest that these endorphins behave similarly to amphetamines. Similarly, other studies agree that Alpha-endorphins effects are similar to psychostimulant drugs.

Ranking based on length, alpha endorphins fall as the shortest chain with 16 amino acids. Meanwhile, the beta-endorphin has the longest chain consisting of the first 16 amino acids to be the same sequence chain of the alpha-endorphin: Tyr-Gly-Gly-Phe-Met-Thr-Ser-Glu-Lys-Ser-Gln-Thr-Pro-Leu-Val-Thr. The same sequence is also present in the gamma-endorphin. The beginning Tyr-Gly-Gly-Phe-Met chain is also known as N-terminal pentapeptide opioid sequence. With such configuration, endorphins act as agonist to opioid receptors in the brain.

Effects on behavior 
Studies have shown that α-endorphin is the strongest peptide in delaying avoidance behaviors. Alpha Endorphin has C-terminal sequence of β-LPH, allowing these peptides to have a high affinity for opiate binding sites. Even a slight difference in C-terminal amino acid can have drastic effects on avoidance behavior. The importance in sequencing determines the function of the endorphin. When an N-terminal amino acid such as tyrosine is removed, there seems to be no significant impacts on avoidance behavior. However, when there are adjustments to the C-terminal sequence, like removing β-LPH 61-65; activity of the endorphin decreases.

See also 
 Endorphin
amphetamines
Beta-Endorphin

References 

Neuropeptides
Opioid peptides